Ian Lesley is an English international lawn bowler.

Bowls career
Lesley became an English national champion in 2016 after winning the triples at the English National Bowls Championships bowling for Shaldon BC. In 2015 he won the triples bronze medal at the Atlantic Bowls Championships.

References

Living people
English male bowls players
Year of birth missing (living people)